Events from the year 1527 in France

Incumbents
 Monarch – Francis I

Events

Births

23 December – Hugues Doneau, law professor (died 1591).

Full date missing
Louis Duret, physician
Jean de Nogaret de La Valette, military officer (died 1575)
Renaud de Beaune, clergyman (died 1606)

Deaths

Full date missing
Charles III, Duke of Bourbon, military officer (born 1490)
Jean Fleury, naval officer

See also

References

1520s in France